A four-minute mile is the completion of a mile run (1609 m) in four minutes or less. It was first achieved in 1954 by Roger Bannister, at age 25, in 3:59.4. As of April 2021, the "four-minute barrier" has been broken by 1,664 athletes, and is now a standard of professional middle distance runners in several cultures. In the 65 years since, the mile record has been lowered by almost 17 seconds, and currently stands at 3:43.13, by Hicham El Guerrouj of Morocco, at age 24, in 1999. Running a mile in four minutes translates to a speed of 15 miles per hour (24 km/h).

Record holders

Breaking the four-minute barrier was first achieved on 6 May 1954 at Oxford University's Iffley Road Track, by British athlete Roger Bannister, with the help of fellow-runners Chris Chataway and Chris Brasher as pacemakers.

Two months later, during the 1954 British Empire and Commonwealth Games hosted in Vancouver, B.C., two competing runners, Australia's John Landy and Bannister, ran the distance of one mile in under four minutes. The race's end is memorialised in a photo, and later a statue, of the two, with Landy looking over his left shoulder, just as Bannister is passing him on the right. Landy thus lost the race. The statue was placed in front of the Pacific National Exhibition entrance plaza.

New Zealand's John Walker, who with a 3:49.4 performance in August 1975 became the first man to run the mile under 3:50, ran 135 sub-four-minute miles during his career (during which he was the first person to run over 100 sub-four-minute miles), and American Steve Scott has run the most sub-four-minute miles, with 136. Algeria's Noureddine Morceli was the first under 3:45. Currently, the mile record is held by Morocco's Hicham El Guerrouj, who ran a time of 3:43.13 in Rome in 1999.

In 1964, America's Jim Ryun became the first high-school runner to break four minutes for the mile, running 3:59.0 as a junior and a then American record 3:55.3 as a senior in 1965. Tim Danielson (1966) and Marty Liquori (1967) also came in under four minutes, but Ryun's high-school record stood until Alan Webb ran 3:53.43 in 2001. Ten years later, in 2011, Lukas Verzbicas became the fifth high-schooler under four minutes. In 2015, Matthew Maton and Grant Fisher became the sixth and seventh high-schoolers to break four minutes, both running 3:59.38 about a month apart. Webb was the first high schooler to run sub-4 indoors, running 3:59.86 in early 2001. On 6 February 2016, Andrew Hunter significantly improved upon Webb's mark, running 3:58.25 on the same New York Armory track and 3:57.81 two weeks later. Hunter achieved the 4-minute mile mark outdoors later in the season at the Prefontaine Classic. At that same meet Michael Slagowski ran his second sub-4-minute of the season. Reed Brown dipped under the barrier on 1 June 2017, running the 4th fastest high school mile time ever recorded in a race: 3:59.30. In 2020, Leo Daschbach clocked 3:59.54 during the Quarantine Clasico, moving to ninth on the all time list. 

Another illustration of the progression of performance in the men's mile is that, in 1994, forty years after Bannister's breaking of the barrier, the Irish runner Eamonn Coghlan became the first man over the age of 40 to run a sub-four-minute mile. Because Coghlan surpassed the mark indoors and before the IAAF validated indoor performances as being eligible for outdoor records, World Masters Athletics still had not recognised a sub-4-minute-mile performance as a record in the M40 division. Many elite athletes made the attempts to extend their careers beyond age 40 to challenge that mark. Over 18 years after Coghlan, that was finally achieved by UK's Anthony Whiteman, running 3:58.79 on 2 June 2012.

In 1997, Daniel Komen of Kenya ran two miles in less than eight minutes, doubling up on Bannister's accomplishment. He did it again in February 1998, falling just 0.3 seconds behind his previous performance of 7:58.61. He is still the only individual to accomplish the feat.

The youngest runner to ever run a four-minute mile is Norwegian runner Jakob Ingebrigtsen, who ran 3:58.07 at the Prefontaine Classic in May 2017, when he was 16 years and 250 days old. However, indoor world champion Yomif Kejelcha of Ethiopia, born August 1st of 1997, ran 4:57.74 in an indoor 2000 m race on February 28, 2014, at age 16 years and 212 days. The run averages to a pace of 3:59.58 per mile for the 1.24-mile race.

Women

No woman has yet run a four-minute mile.

The women's world record is currently at 4:12.33, set by Sifan Hassan of the Netherlands at the Diamond League meeting in Monaco on 12 July 2019. The previous women's world record, 4:12.56 set by Svetlana Masterkova of Russia on 14 August 1996 at Zürich, stood for almost 23 years: Masterkova became the first woman to run the mile in less than 4 minutes and 15 seconds.

Possible other claims 
A number of people have claimed to have beaten the four-minute mile before Bannister.

James Parrott (1770)
Some (notably Olympic medallist Peter Radford) contend the first successful four-minute mile was run by James Parrott on 9 May 1770. He ran the 1-mile, west-to-east, length of Old Street to finish somewhere within the grounds/building of Shoreditch Church. Timing methods at this time were—after the invention of the chronometer by John Harrison—accurate enough to measure the four minutes correctly, and sporting authorities of the time accepted the claim as genuine. Old Street has a  11 foot downward fall, with intermittent gentle undulations. Neal Bascomb notes in The Perfect Mile that "even nineteenth-century historians cast a skeptical eye on the account."

Weller Run (1796) 
On 10 October 1796, The Sporting Magazine reported that a young man called Weller, who was one of three brothers, "undertook for a wager of three guineas to run one mile on the Banbury Road, in four minutes, which he performed two seconds within the time." This is  yet about 5 months' worth of typical rural labourer pay at the time. By the late 1700s, a mile could be routinely measured to within a few inches; watches, thanks to John Harrison, could measure 4 minutes to within 0.0009 sec (i.e. gain or lose 10 seconds a month), and after about 1750 the mass production of highly accurate watches was well underway.

Glenn Cunningham (1920s)
It is also reputed that Glenn Cunningham achieved a four-minute mile in a workout in the 1920s. In addition to being unsubstantiated, a workout run would not count as a record.

In popular culture

In 1955 Putnam & Co. Ltd. published Roger Bannister's account of the events in First Four Minutes. This was later adapted as "The Four-Minute Mile" by Reader's Digest in 1958.

In the 17 November 1956 Season 2 Episode 26 Whole No. 65 of Science Fiction Theatre entitled "Three Minute Mile", a scientist (Marshall Thompson) attempts to create a super athlete (Martin Milner).

In the 1971 film The Omega Man, protagonist Robert Neville, as played by Charlton Heston, claims to have run a mile in 3 minutes and 50 seconds.

In 1988, the ABC and the BBC co-produced The Four Minute Mile, a miniseries dramatization of the race to the four-minute mile, featuring Richard Huw as Bannister and Nique Needles as John Landy (who was simultaneously pursuing the milestone). It was written by David Williamson and directed by Jim Goddard.

In 2004, Neal Bascomb wrote a book entitled The Perfect Mile about Roger Bannister, John Landy, and Wes Santee, portraying their individual attempts to break the four-minute mile and the context of the sport of mile racing. A second film version (entitled Four Minutes) was made in 2005, starring Jamie Maclachlan as Bannister.

Also in 2004, a 50 pence coin was minted in the United Kingdom to celebrate the 50th anniversary of Bannister running the four-minute mile. There were 9,032,500 minted in 2004. The coin was re-struck in 2019 as part of the '50 years of the 50p coin' set released by the Royal Mint, only for collector sets.

In 2005, ESPN released an tv adaptation of the event called “Four Minutes” featuring Jamie Maclachlan as Roger Bannister and Christopher Plummer as his wheelchair-using coach, Archie Mason.

In June 2011, the watch used to time the original event was donated by Jeffrey Archer to a charity auction for Oxford University Athletics Club; it sold for £97,250.

In July 2016, the BBC broadcast the documentary Bannister: Everest on the Track, The Roger Bannister Story with firsthand interviews from Bannister and various other figures on the first sub-4-minute mile.

In April 2022 HBO TV Show "Winning Time: The Rise of the Lakers Dynasty" mentioned Roger Bannister's four-minute mile in a cold open.

See also
 Mile run
 Mile run world record progression
 Dream Mile
 10-second barrier
 The two-hour marathon, a similar barrier that was broken in 2019 by Eliud Kipchoge as part of the Ineos 1:59 Challenge
 Big Hawk Chief

References

Further reading

External links

 Roger Bannister and the Four-Minute Mile Original reports from The Times
 Forbes magazine declared four-minute mile as "greatest athletic achievement"
 
 
 Official website for documentary – Franz Stampfl: The Man Behind the Miracle Mile – a film about the coach behind Bannister's successful mile record attempt 

Middle-distance running
Sport in Oxford
1954 in athletics (track and field)
History of Oxford